FK Alumina is a football club from Skopje, North Macedonia. The club recently played in the Macedonian Third League.

History
The club was founded in 1950.
The administration of Bregalnica from Stip took control of Alumina in the summer of 2008. Since the club's name has been changed and operate by FK Bregalnica Štip.

References

External links
Club info at MacedonianFootball 
Football Federation of Macedonia 

Alumina
Association football clubs established in 1950
1950 establishments in the Socialist Republic of Macedonia